Charles Vallin (1903–1948) was a French politician.

Early life
Charles Vallin was born on 3 July 1903 in Saint-Mihiel, Meuse, France.

Career
He joined the Croix-de-Feu and later, the French Social Party, a conservative political party. He served as a member of the Chamber of Deputies from 6 November 1938 to 31 May 1942.

He later joined the French Resistance and became close to General Charles De Gaulle.

Death
He died on 13 April 1948 in Algiers, Algeria.

Legacy
The Place Charles Vallin in the 15th arrondissement of Paris is named in his honour.

References

1903 births
1948 deaths
People from Saint-Mihiel
Politicians from Grand Est
French Social Party politicians
Republican Party of Liberty politicians
Members of the 16th Chamber of Deputies of the French Third Republic
People of Vichy France
French Resistance members
Order of the Francisque recipients